Ian Callum McGibbon  (born 7 December 1947) is a New Zealand historian, specialising in military and political history of the 20th century. He has published several books on New Zealand participation in the First and Second World Wars.

Biography
Born on 7 December 1947 in Dannevirke, McGibbon was educated at Victoria University of Wellington. He earned a Bachelor of Arts in 1968, Honours the following year and in 1971, he graduated with a Master of Arts degree with distinction, majoring in history.

His career as a historian began with an appointment in 1971 as the Defence Historian at the Ministry of Defence, where he worked for eight years. In 1979, he started work for the Department of Internal Affairs in the Historical Publications Branch. From 1982, he was the only staff member dealing with military history and produced the official history of New Zealand's involvement in the Korean War. In 1994 he earned a Doctor of Letters, also from Victoria University. He later was General Editor (War History) at the Ministry for Culture and Heritage. His primary area of interest is New Zealand military history and politics, with particular focus on 20th-century warfare.

In the 1997 Queen's Birthday Honours, McGibbon was appointed an Officer of the New Zealand Order of Merit, for services to historical research. From 2010 to 2014, McGibbon was a participant in the Joint Historical and Archaeological Survey of the Anzac Battlefield, working alongside historians and archaeologists from Australia and Turkey; he edited Anzac Battlefield: A Gallipoli Landscape of War and Memory, the resulting publication from the Cambridge University Press.

Publications
McGibbon's publications include:

Author
Blue-Water Rationale: The Naval Defence of New Zealand 1914–1942 (1981)
The Path To Gallipoli (1991)
New Zealand and the Korean War
 Volume I: Politics and Diplomacy (1992)
 Volume II: Combat Operations (1996)The Western Front: A Guide to New Zealand Battlefields and Memorials (2001)Gallipoli: A Guide to New Zealand Battlefields and Memorials (2005)Kiwi Sappers: The Corps of Royal New Zealand Engineers' Century of Service (2002)New Zealand and the Second World War: The People, the Battles and the Legacy (2004)New Zealand’s Vietnam War: A History of Combat, Commitment and Controversy (2011)New Zealand's Western Front Campaign (2016)

EditorUndiplomatic Dialogue: Letters Between Carl Berendsen and Alister McIntosh, 1943–52 (1994)Unofficial Channels: Letters between Alister Mcintosh and Foss Shanahan, George Laking and Frank Corner 1946–1966  (1999)Oxford Companion To New Zealand Military History (2000)One Flag, One Queen, One Tongue: New Zealand and the South African War (2003)New Zealand's Great War: New Zealand, the Allies and the First World War (2007)ANZAC Battlefield: A Gallipoli Landscape of War and Memory'' (2016)

References 

Historians of World War I
Historians of World War II
Military historians
20th-century New Zealand historians
Living people
1947 births
Victoria University of Wellington alumni
People from Dannevirke
New Zealand public servants
Officers of the New Zealand Order of Merit
21st-century New Zealand historians